The cock-tailed tyrant (Alectrurus tricolor) is a species of bird in the family Tyrannidae.
It is found in Argentina, Bolivia, Brazil, and Paraguay.
Its natural habitats are subtropical or tropical dry lowland grassland and subtropical or tropical seasonally wet or flooded lowland grassland.
It is threatened by habitat loss.

Gallery

References

External links
BirdLife Species Factsheet. 

cock-tailed tyrant
Birds of Bolivia
Birds of Brazil
Birds of Paraguay
cock-tailed tyrant
Taxa named by Louis Jean Pierre Vieillot
Taxonomy articles created by Polbot